Dehtáře is a municipality and village in Pelhřimov District in the Vysočina Region of the Czech Republic. It has about 100 inhabitants.

Administrative parts
Villages of Milotice, Onšovice and Vadčice are administrative parts of Dehtáře.

References

Villages in Pelhřimov District